The term artificial refers to something having the property of artificiality.

Artificial may also refer to:

Artificial (film), a 2012 Telugu short film
"Artificial", a 2008 song and EP by Kris Menace and Felix da Housecat
Artificial, a 1999 album by God Module
Artificial, a 2010 album by Unitopia
Artificial (web series), created by Evan Mandery and Bernie Su
Artificial, a type of call in the game of contract bridge; see Glossary of contract bridge terms#artificial

See also